Joe Reiniger (born December 7, 1970 in Collinsville, Illinois) is a professional soccer player and coach. He grew up in Caseyville. 

Reiniger has played forward for the St. Louis Ambush, Milwaukee Wave, and the St. Louis Steamers.  He went to college at Southern Illinois University Edwardsville and graduated in 1993.  He was selected in the first round of the NPSL amateur draft by the Ambush in 1993, and was named to the 1993-94 NPSL All-Rookie Team.  While playing with the Wave, he was the MVP of the 2001 NPSL Championship.  His number is 21.  He plays forward and is left footed, but right-handed.  He's married to Kim, and has a daughter named Jordyn.  He resides in Collinsville.

During the 2005-06 season while St. Louis Steamers head coach Omid Namazi was on a suspension, he served as the head coach.
 
On April 1, 2006 he scored his 600th career goal in front of 8,795 fans at the Savvis Center in St. Louis, Missouri.  Retro jerseys were being worn by the players that night and were auctioned to the fans.  The winning bidder of Reiniger's jersey bought it for 950 dollars and gave it back to him.

In September 2006, the Steamers were placed on the inactive list for the 2006-2007 season and the MISL had a draft.  The Milwaukee Wave got the rights of Reiniger, but he did not sign a contract with them.

In November 2008, he signed with the St. Louis Illusion in the Professional Arena Soccer League.

In September 2011, he joined the Illinois Piasa as co-head coach for the 2011–12 season.

References

External links
 St Louis Steamer's site

1970 births
Living people
American soccer coaches
American soccer players
Association football forwards
Major Indoor Soccer League (2001–2008) players
Milwaukee Wave players
People from Collinsville, Illinois
Professional Arena Soccer League players
Soccer players from Illinois
Soccer players from St. Louis
SIU Edwardsville Cougars men's soccer players
St. Louis Ambush (1992–2000) players
St. Louis Steamers (1998–2006) players
Southern Illinois University Edwardsville alumni
People from St. Clair County, Illinois
Player-coaches
Professional Arena Soccer League coaches
Major Indoor Soccer League (2001–2008) coaches
St. Louis Illusion players